Inga leptingoides is a species of plant in the family Fabaceae. It is found only in Suriname.

References

leptingoides
Flora of Suriname
Vulnerable plants
Taxonomy articles created by Polbot